Intercity is the second-highest train classification in Germany, after the ICE. Intercity services are loco-hauled express train services, usually over long-distances. There are Intercity routes throughout Germany, and routes generally operate with a two-hour frequency, with multiple routes giving a more frequent service on core routes. Intercity services are operated by the DB Fernverkehr sector of Deutsche Bahn.

The Intercity name was introduced in Germany in 1971, replacing the old F-Zug category, and was the top category of train in Germany until the introduction of the ICEs in the early 1990s. With the proliferation of ICE services, the role of IC trains has diminished slightly, and they have taken on the character of many former InterRegio trains. Nonetheless, Intercity trains still offer a very high standard of speed and comfort – all services convey first class accommodation, and most include catering – usually a Bistro Cafe, but some services include a restaurant. A number of Intercity services serve destinations outside Germany; most of these are under the EuroCity classification.

History

Inception

The idea for Intercity services on the Deutsche Bundesbahn network was first proposed in 1967, inspired by the success of British Rail's InterCity brand. After some planning, the proposal was approved in 1969, and the services were finally introduced in September 1971, after some delays in delivery of new coaching stock. The original network consisted of four lines, operating every two hours, and connecting the largest cities in West Germany. At this time, Intercity trains were first-class only. The original lines were:

 line 1 (red): Hamburg-Altona – Bremen – Münster (Westf) – Dortmund – Essen – Duisburg – Düsseldorf – Cologne – Bonn – Koblenz – Mainz – Mannheim – Heidelberg – Stuttgart – Ulm – Augsburg – Munich
 line 2 (blue): Hannover – Bielefeld – Hamm – Dortmund – Hagen – Wuppertal-Elberfeld (– Solingen-Ohligs) – Cologne – Bonn – Koblenz – Wiesbaden – Frankfurt (Main) – Würzburg – Nuremberg – Augsburg – Munich
 line 3 (green): Hamburg-Altona – Hannover – Göttingen – Fulda – Frankfurt (Main) – Mannheim – Karlsruhe – Freiburg (Breisgau) – Basel
 line 4 (gold): Bremen – Hannover – Göttingen – Bebra – Fulda – Würzburg (– Ingolstadt) – Munich

Gradually, the Intercity network started to expand, and with the introduction of the Class 103 locomotives, 200 km/h running was possible. Services were increased in frequency to hourly, and second class accommodation was provided – in 1979 this was promoted with the slogan "every hour, every class".

Additionally, there is also another new line 5, running from Dortmund to Munich. It was opened since 2 May 1985.

 line 1 (red): Hamburg-Altona – Bremen – Osnabrück – Münster (Westf) – Dortmund – Bochum – Essen – Duisburg – Düsseldorf – Köln – Bonn – Koblenz – Wiesbaden – Frankfurt (Main)
 line 2 (brown): Hannover – Bielefeld – Hamm – Dortmund – Essen – Duisburg – Düsseldorf – Cologne – Bonn – Koblenz – Mainz – Mannheim – Heidelberg – Stuttgart – Ulm – Augsburg – Munich
 line 3 (green): Hamburg-Altona – Hannover – Göttingen – Fulda – Frankfurt (Main) – Mannheim – Karlsruhe – Freiburg (Breisgau) – Basel (– Switzerland)
 line 4 (gold): Hamburg-Altona – Hannover – Göttingen – Bebra – Fulda – Würzburg – Augsburg – München
 line 4a (grey): Oldenburg or Bremerhaven – Bremen – Hannover
 line 5 (blue): Dortmund – Hagen – Wuppertal-Elberfeld (– Solingen-Ohligs) – Cologne – Bonn – Koblenz – Mainz – Frankfurt Airport – Frankfurt (Main) (– Aschaffenburg) – Würzburg – Nuremberg – Augsburg – Munich

The InterCity for 3a is also part of the TransEuropExpress:

 line 3a: Amsterdam – Utrecht – Oberhausen – Duisburg – Düsseldorf – Köln – Bonn – Koblenz – Mainz – (Mannheim – Karlsruhe – Freiburg (Breisgau) – Basel) or (Mannheim – Heidelberg – Stuttgart – Ulm – Augsburg – Munich – Salzburg) or (Frankfurt Airport – Frankfurt (Main) – Würzburg – Augsburg – Munich – Innsbruck)
Some ICs switched between lines 4 and 5, 2 and 5 (Essen or Wuppertal), or 2 and 3 (Basel or Stuttgart).

Reunification and growth

The network continued to evolve throughout the 1980s, and in the early 1990s it saw major changes. One major driving force for this was German reunification, which saw the network expand across the former East Germany, but also the opening of two high-speed lines in 1991: Mannheim to Stuttgart and Hannover to Würzburg. The first generation ICEs were introduced around this time, and took over most services on the Hannover – Fulda corridor, while the remaining services expanded in all directions.

The routes on 2 June 1991 were as follows:

 IC line 1 (red): Hamburg-Altona – Bremen – Münster (Westf) – Dortmund – Essen – Duisburg – Düsseldorf – Cologne – Bonn – Koblenz – Mainz – Frankfurt (Main) Flughafen – Frankfurt (Main) – Aschaffenburg – Würzburg – Nürnberg – (Ingolstadt – Munich) or (Regensburg – Passau – Linz – Wien) (connecting to Austria)
 IC line 1a (magenta): Wiesbaden – Frankfurt (Main) (every two hours)
 IC line 2 (brown): (Dortmund – Bochum) or (Münster (Westf) – Recklinghausen – Gelsenkirchen) – Essen – Duisburg – Düsseldorf – Köln – Bonn – Koblenz – Mainz – Mannheim – Heidelberg – Stuttgart – Ulm – Augsburg – Munich (eight EC train pairs via Salzburg to Budapest, Klagenfurt, Wien or Zagreb)
 IC line 2a (magenta): Wiesbaden – Mainz
 IC line 3 (green): Berlin – Potsdam – Magdeburg – Helmstedt – Braunschweig – Hildesheim – Göttingen – Kassel-Wilhelmshöhe – Fulda – Frankfurt (Main) – Mannheim – Karlsruhe (every two hours, one EC train pair via Basel to Zürich)
 IC line 4 (gold): Hamburg-Altona – Hannover – Göttingen – Kassel-Wilhelmshöhe – Fulda – Würzburg – Augsburg – Munich (every two hours to Nuremberg)
 IC line 5 (blue): (every two hours: Berlin – Potsdam – Magdeburg –) Braunschweig – Hannover– Bielefeld – Hamm – Dortmund – Hagen – Wuppertal – Solingen-Ohligs – Cologne – Bonn – Koblenz – Mainz – Mannheim – Karlsruhe – Freiburg (Breisgau) – Basel (new EC pairs of trains to Brig, Chur, Geneva, Interlaken, Milan or Sestri Levante)
 EC line 5a (lilac): Amsterdam – Utrecht – Emmerich – Oberhausen – Duisburg – Düsseldorf – Cologne (every two hours, two EC train pairs on line 5 to Chur and Interlaken)
 ICE line 6 (orange): Hamburg-Altona – Hannover – Göttingen – Kassel-Wilhelmshöhe – Fulda – Frankfurt (Main) – Mannheim – Stuttgart – Ulm – Augsburg – Munich 
 IC line 6a (grey): Oldenburg or Bremerhaven – Bremen – Hannover

Meanwhile, a new type of express train – the InterRegio – was created in the late-1980s, replacing the old D-Zug services, providing semi-fast services to complement Intercity trains.

The new changes on 31 May 1992 were as follows:
 IC line 1 (red): from Nuremberg to Munich
 IC line 3 (green): Hamburg-Altona – Hannover – Göttingen – Kassel-Wilhelmshöhe – Fulda – Frankfurt – Mannheim – Karlsruhe (– Basel – Zürich)
 ICE line 4 (yellow): either Bremen or Hamburg-Altona, to Nuremberg
 IC line 6a (grey): every two hours Bremen – Hannover
 IC line 8 (lime): Berlin – Flughafen Berlin-Schönefeld – Leipzig – Naumburg – Jena – Saalfeld – Probstzella – Lichtenfels – Bamberg – Erlangen – Nuremberg – Ingolstadt – Munich (every two hours)

From 1996, IC line 8 was connected from Berlin to Hamburg, which together with IC line 7 between the two cities, which ran until 1998, created an hourly service. IC line 5 ran from 1997 via Hanover Magdeburg and Leipzig to Dresden instead of Berlin. as a result, the new ICE line 10 was established from Berlin to Cologne/Bonn. At the same time, the branch to Basel, which was previously served by IC line 5, was abandoned. The line now ended in Nuremberg. From 1998 the trains of ICE line 6 and ICE line 10 ran over the new Berlin–Hanover line.

Modern era
The next major change to Intercity services came about in 2002, with the opening of the Cologne–Frankfurt high-speed rail line largely to replace the West Rhine Railway, a major trunk route for Intercity services. While previous high speed lines in Germany had been designed for mixed usage, and could be used by Intercity trains, this line can only be operated by new ICE 3 units. This, along with the introduction of another generation of ICEs, the ICE T, saw large numbers of Intercity routes converted to ICE. Meanwhile, the InterRegio classification was abolished, and many of its services converted into Intercity routes.

As a result, the character of Intercity has changed. Having been on an almost equal footing with the ICE, it is very much secondary. While it still provides a high quality of service, trains now stop more frequently, and are more commonly found on lesser routes. Most current IC trains convey fewer first-class coaches, more open seating as opposed to compartments, and a Bistro Cafe (buffet car) instead of a restaurant or no on-board catering at all, although this is as much a reflection of the changing habits of modern passengers than it is a change in the status of Intercity trains. Lines 30 and 31 – Hamburg to Frankfurt/Stuttgart are the closest in character to a 'classic' Intercity train.

Current services
Deutsche Bahn's long distance services are operated over numbered routes. If they are operated by Intercity-Express rolling stock they are considered to be Intercity-Express lines. Lines operated by Intercity rolling stock or a mixture of Intercity and Intercity-Express sets are listed below (as of 2022).

Line 17 

IC line 17 was established on 15 December 2019. This is a service that has been served every two hours since 9 March 2020. Between Rostock and Berlin, IC line 17 is the successor to Interregio line 14, which operated here until 2002. Some services of trains on IC line 28 are replaced here by line 17. On the section between Berlin and Dresden, the line supplements the heavily used Eurocity line 27 to Prague and has connected Berlin Brandenburg Airport since it opened.

Since the Stadler KISS multiple units used on IC route 17 are owned by the Austrian Westbahn and are serviced in Vienna, a pair of trains runs six times a week overnight between Rostock and Vienna via Nuremberg.

Line 26 

Intercity rolling stock are used for some rotations on ICE/IC line 26.

Line 27 

On the main route of EC line 27, Intercity and Eurocity services run every two hours between Hamburg and Prague. A pair of trains continue to Budapest. One pair of trains a day runs between Westerland or Dagebüll and Berlin. Between Berlin and Dresden, together with line 17, there is a service approximately every hour. Since 16 June 2020, a pair of Railjet services have operated between Berlin and Graz.

1  runs through coaches from Niebüll to Dagebüll Mole via the following stations. They do not run as IC services, but as NEG regional services:

Line 28 

Line 28 is divided into two sub-lines, on which only individual services operate. The northern begins in Berlin and goes to Binz. The southern part of the line connects Nuremberg and Munich via Augsburg. A third partial line between Berlin and Rostock was merged into the newly created IC line 17 in December 2019.

For operational reasons, due to the priority allocation of the ICE-T sets equipped with ETCS to lines 15 and 50, some pairs of trains on line 28 were converted to Intercity operation. The IC trains run normally at the same speed as the ICE line with almost identical journey times. These included the three IC train pairs 2300/2301, 2302/2303 and 2355/2356 from Berlin via Leipzig, Jena and Augsburg to Munich. The  2355/2356 train pair ran from/to Rostock. Depending on the season, the trains begin or end in Warnemünde.

Line 30 

Line 30 runs every two hours between Hamburg and Mannheim via the West Rhine Railway. While the IC trains run from Mannheim to Stuttgart, the EC trains run to Switzerland via Karlsruhe. Individual trains start and end on Sylt, on Rügen, in Stralsund, Greifswald, Kiel, Frankfurt am Main or Offenburg. Since the 2017 annual timetable, Bochum has no longer been a regular stop for line 30. Only a few trains stop there at the end of the day.

At weekends, additional trains run between Hamburg and Cologne, some of which start in Flensburg or on Fehmarn and take the route between Münster and Duisburg via Recklinghausen.

Line 31 

Line 31 runs every two hours between Hamburg and Frankfurt via the West Rhine Railway. Together with line 30, it forms an hourly service between Hamburg and Mainz. At the end of the day, individual trains run beyond Frankfurt to Nuremberg, Regensburg or Passau. In the north, individual trains reach Kiel or Lübeck. Line 31 usually runs between Dortmund and Cologne via Wuppertal, while individual trains run via Essen at the end of the day. On Fridays there is an additional service (2224) from Munich to Frankfurt via Augsburg and Würzburg.

Line 32 

The northern section of the line has no regular pattern of daily services. On Fridays and Sundays, the trains run approximately every hour between Cologne and Berlin, on the other days there are only individual services. In Berlin, trains start and end at the Hauptbahnhof, Ostbahnhof, Südkreuz or Gesundbrunnen.

Services on the southern section consist of four daily pairs of trains running from North Rhine-Westphalia to Klagenfurt, Innsbruck, Oberstdorf and Tübingen.

Seasonally, a pair of trains runs on the weekend from Cologne via Stralsund and Bergen to Binz.

Individual trains (EC 115 and IC 1926) run on different routes via Münster.

A pair of trains runs Monday to Friday from Aachen to Berlin via Mönchengladbach and Krefeld and a pair of trains runs on the weekend from Aachen via Mönchengladbach and Neuss:

On the southern section there are trains from Dortmund to Stuttgart, from Wolfsburg to Munich, from Berlin to Stuttgart and from Tübingen and Salzburg to Berlin on Fridays, while on Sundays there are trains from Berlin to Stuttgart, Tübingen and Karlsruhe and from Frankfurt to Berlin.

On the northern section, a pair of weekend trains runs from/to Dresden.

Thus, there are also individual services of line 32 on the following routes:

Line 34 

Trains run every two hours between Frankfurt and Siegen. Two pairs of trains run at high speed from Siegen via Unna and Hamm to Münster and continue via Emden to Norddeich Mole; the other six train pairs take over almost all stops for regional traffic and run to Dortmund or via Dortmund to Münster. These slower trains can also be used between Dillenburg and Iserlohn-Letmathe with local tickets. The first train on Mondays to Fridays towards Dortmund runs from Stuttgart via Karlsruhe, Heidelberg, Mannheim and Frankfurt Airport.

Line 35 

Trains run every two hours between Emden and Cologne. Individual trains start at Norddeich Mole or Emden Außenhafen. South of Cologne, individual trains continue to Koblenz and on weekends to Konstanz or Stuttgart. Emden Außenhafen is only served from March to October. A pair of trains runs from Norddeich Mole to Bonn-Bad Godesberg and from Bad Godesberg to Emden.

Line 37 

Since the 2018 annual timetable, a daily pair of trains has again been running between Düsseldorf and Luxembourg. Until December 2014, this section was part of line 35. (Stadler KISS) double-deck multiple units of the CFL are used. On the Koblenz–Trier railway, the train runs as an RE, between Koblenz and Düsseldorf as an IC on behalf of DB Fernverkehr with the option of reserving seats and taking bicycles.

Line 50 

Line 50 is based on ICE line 50 and supplements it with relief journeys on Fridays and Sundays as well as journeys on the "Mid-Germany Railway" (Mitte-Deutschland-Verbindung, MDV). Line 50 MDV (formerly line 51) runs four pairs of trains between Düsseldorf/Cologne and Gera/Leipzig via Dortmund, Hamm, Soest, Lippstadt, Paderborn, Altenbeken, Warburg, Kassel-Wilhelmshöhe, Bebra, Eisenach, Gotha and Erfurt. The services that relieve the ICE line during peak hours are grouped as line 50 E. The "E" stands for Entlastungsverkehr (relief traffic).

Line 55 

Line 55 runs every two hours from Dresden via Leipzig, Magdeburg, Hanover, Dortmund, Hagen and Wuppertal to Cologne.

The stop at Leipzig/Halle Airport has only been served in the direction of Magdeburg since the 2017 annual timetable. The Intercity 2 sets that have been in use since the 2017 annual timetable no longer stop in Bad Oeynhausen.

Line 56 

Line 56 starts in Norddeich Mole and runs every two hours via Braunschweig to Leipzig. A few trains use an alternative route from Emden Außenhafen station. Peine is served by two trains in the direction of Leipzig and one in the direction of Emden. One pair of trains runs from Magdeburg via Potsdam and Berlin to Cottbus; it is the only long-distance service to stop at some stations. The other trains run via Köthen and Halle to Leipzig. Intercity 2 sets have been in service since December 2015.

A pair of trains on route 56 runs to Warnemünde from Friday to Sunday, but only seasonally from March to October. IC 1932 also runs on Sundays on line 56 from Stralsund to Oldenburg.

Between Norddeich Mole and Bremen, the trains run one hour later than the RE 1; on this section they can be used with local transport tickets.

Line 60 

Line 60 ran between Karlsruhe and Munich every two hours until December 2022. It is now operated as ICE line 60.

Line 61 

Line 61 runs every two hours between Karlsruhe and Nuremberg. Schorndorf is only served by a single pair of daytime trains, which continue to Leipzig. Since the line runs via Pforzheim, it only uses part of the Mannheim–Stuttgart high-speed railway. Since December 2018, the line has been gradually converted to operation with Intercity 2 sets.

Line 62 

Three pairs of trains a day run between Frankfurt am Main and Salzburg. Two of them go from Frankfurt to Klagenfurt and Graz. Deviating from this, the third starts in Saarbrücken and ends in Graz.

Line 75 

Three pairs of trains run every four hours on line 75 between Hamburg and Copenhagen, replacing ICE line 75 since the 2018 timetable. Until the 2019 timetable change, they ran via Puttgarden, where they were loaded onto a ferry to Rødby and then continued to Copenhagen. Due to construction work, the trains have been running across the Danish mainland since December 2019, which, together with line 76, creates a two-hour service between Hamburg and Padborg.

Line 76 

Individual services run between Hamburg and Aarhus. In Hamburg, the line starts at the main station and does not serve Hamburg-Altona. Since December 2017, lines 75 and 76 have been operated exclusively with Danish diesel multiple units of the IC3 class, which have been equipped with the PZB train protection system and are therefore approved for operation on the German network.

Line 77 

Line 77 runs between Amsterdam and Berlin every two hours. The trains only stop in Bünde and Bad Oeynhausen every four hours, in Ibbenbüren a single train towards Berlin in the morning.

One to two pairs of trains daily (IC 2241/2242, Sunday IC 2343/2240) do not go to the Netherlands, but instead run from Osnabrück to Münster.

The line will be served by ECx trains from December 2023.

Line 87 

Until 2010, this line was run as ICE 87, but as there were not enough ICE T sets available due to several problems, locomotive-hauled Intercity trains were used.

An hourly service is offered between Stuttgart and Zurich. Every two hours it is served by Deutsche Bahn IC2 runs from Stuttgart to Singen. Two pairs of trains continue to Konstanz from Monday to Friday. To continue to Zurich, it is usually necessary to change trains in Singen to a Swiss Federal Railways (SBB) service. In the other hour there is a direct connection operated by SBB from Stuttgart to Zurich, but with fewer intermediate stops. Line 87 will be fully converted to Intercity 2 trains when the installation of ETCS equipment in the Swiss network is completed. Local transport tickets are also valid from Stuttgart to Singen/Konstanz.

Line 88 
Six pairs of trains run daily on the EuroCity-Express line 88 operated with RABe 503 multiple units of the SBB, which are classified as Eurocity between Lindau-Reutin and Zurich.

Line 89 

Line 89 runs every two hours from Munich to Verona. There are also two pairs of trains in the morning hours to Bologna.

Line 95 

Four pairs of trains run daily between Berlin and Warsaw. These are called the Berlin-Warszawa-Express and are operated by DB Fernverkehr and Polskie Koleje Państwowe. They differ visually from the typical IC cars. In addition, a pair of trains runs via Gdańsk to Gdynia and a pair of trains to Kraków.

Named services
Originally, all Intercity services had names, usually named after a famous figure from one of the cities along the route. Nowadays, fewer services are named, usually those that serve the extremities of the rail network. Names are usually taken from a geographical location along the route.

Rolling stock

Motive power
The original Intercity services were hauled by the Class 103 electric locomotives, built in the early-1970s and capable of 200 km/h. Lesser routes were operated by Class 110 and 111 locos, but these had a lower maximum speed, and with line speeds increasing, their use became untenable. A new Class 120 was introduced in 1987, and these classes were relegated to Regional duties. In the mid-1990s the Class 101 was introduced, and these locomotives now dominate Intercity services, with the 103s having been largely retired in the early-2000s.

On non-electrified Intercity routes, such as Hamburg to Westerland, or Ulm to Lindau, Class 218 diesel locomotives are used, usually double-headed. For cross-border services, multi-voltage electric locos are needed, such as the Class 181 to France and Luxembourg or the Class 180 into the Czech Republic and Poland.

After German reunification, former Deutsche Reichsbahn locomotives could be found on Intercity services – not only the Class 180s, but the 112 (electric) and 219 (diesel) locos. While the 219s have been retired, the 112s are now solely used on Regional-Expresses due to their top speed of 160 km/h.

While most Intercity trains have been loco-hauled, a small number of services have been operated by multiple units: early services were operated by the VT 11.5 and Class 403 (1973) TEE units, while Nuremberg to Dresden route, was briefly operated by Class 612 DMUs in Intercity livery. This service was later classified as an Interregio-Express (part of DB Regio) and the units were painted in standard DB red. Through service on that route has since been withdrawn altogether with Mitteldeutsche Regio Bahn serving the electrified route from Dresden to Hof and DB Regio serving the route from Hof to Nuremberg.

Gallery

Coaching stock
Early Intercity trains used classic Eurofima stock, shared with TEE and D-Zug expresses, but with the growth of the network in the 1980s, and the inclusion of second class, large numbers of new air-conditioned coaches were built, which are still in use to this day. In the mid-1990s driving trailers were introduced on Intercity and Interregio services, which had the effect of speeding up journey times: many major German railway stations are termini, so a lot of Intercity services include at least one change of direction. With the demise of Interregio in 2002, a large number of IR coaches were incorporated in Intercity services – particularly second class coaches but also the Bistro Café, which has replaced a full restaurant on most routes.

Formations
Intercity trains are usually 7 to 11 coaches long, depending on the route. There are one or two first class coaches – one compartment coach, and one open on longer trains. A few routes still use restaurants, but most use a bistro cafe, which also provides half a coach of first-class accommodation. Most of the second class coaches are open, but with some compartments, and some ex-Interregio coaches. Cycle space is provided by the driving trailer, but these are not used on all routes, so there are some non-driving coaches with space for bicycles.

Livery
Intercity coaches were originally in the blue and beige colour scheme employed on D-Zug services, with first class coaches in the TEE dark red and beige. A rebranding of the Deutsche Bundesbahn in the mid-1980s saw a new colour scheme for Intercity services, orient red and light grey with a pastel pink stripe in between. When DB adopted traffic red as its corporate colour in the mid-1990s, this replaced orient red, with the pink stripe taken off, before a new livery was introduced in 2000s – based on the Intercity-Express, the coaches are all white with a red stripe.

Refurbishment
In 2012, DB began a programme of refurbishing the interior its Intercity coaches with decor similar to that found in the ICE3. Name of the programme is IC mod. The work is expected to be completed by 2014.

Overview

Future rolling stock

Deutsche Bahn plans to replace most Intercity and Eurocity rolling stock with Intercity-Express ICE 4 electric multiple unit trainsets by 2025. ICE 4 is a Deutsche Bahn project to procure up to 300 fourth generation Intercity-Express trains to replace its existing Intercity fleets used on long-distance passenger services in Germany.

In addition to the ICE 4, Deutsche Bahn has awarded Bombardier Transportation a contract to supply double-decker coaches for Intercity services. These kind of coaches are used in German Regional-Express trains, for Intercity services the coaches will get a more comfortable interior than in regional train double-decker coaches. In both classes only open coaches are provided, there will be no dining car. The double-decker coaches have been in service since 2015. Unlike most previous IC stock the new trains, marketed as "InterCity 2" by DB have a top speed of 160 km/h and are mainly intended for routes where higher speeds aren't possible or would offer little or no benefit with the ICE 4 to take over routes with maximum speeds between 160 km/h and 250 km/h. The IC2 is also intended to expand the Intercity network to cities that had lost their long-distance service upon withdrawal of the Interregio.

See also
EuroCity in Germany
Intercity-Express
Trans Europe Express
InterCity (in other countries)

Notes

External links

Deutsche Bahn 
DB Intercity 1 (IC1) 
DB Intercity 2 (IC2) 
Fernbahn.de – Information on long-distance train services in Germany 
2023 Deutsche Bahn IC/EC Network

Passenger rail transport in Germany
High-speed rail in Germany